Services Sports Control Board (SSCB) is a sports board run by the Indian Armed Forces. It was formed in 1919 as the Army Sports Control Board and later renamed to Services Sports Control Board. The board is represented as Services in the National Games of India. It has been one of the leading medal winners in the National Games.

As a member of the Board of Control for Cricket in India, it governs the sport of cricket in the Indian Armed Forces and administers the Services cricket team. It is also an associate member of the All India Football Federation and administers the Services football team. They have several other sport departments.

History 
The organization was first started as the Army Sports Control Board in March 1919, on the same lines as the ASCB in the United Kingdom. The sports organizations of the three services were amalgamated on 3 April 1945 with the approval of the then Commander-in-Chief and the Services Sports Control Board.

Teams 
The teams of Indian Armed Forces are selected by the SSCB (Services Sports Control Board). These teams are fielded and represented as the Services team in the National Games of India, the World Military Games and various other international sporting events, including the Olympics.

Organizational structure 
In 1947, the Chiefs of Staff Committee had approved the reconstitution of the Services Sports Control Board. The three services would from then run the Services Sports Control Board in rotation for a period of tenure. The tenure involves the change of president and secretary every three years. Starting from 2020,the administering service is Indian Air Force.

Group Captain Dinesh Suri of the Indian Air Force is the current serving secretary of the SSCB.

SSCB secretaries (1945–present)

Railways teams

Cricket
Services cricket team

Football
Services football team

See also 
Indian Armed Forces
Ministry of Defence
Railways Sports Promotion Board
Sports Authority of India

References

External links 
Official website
Services Sports Control Board – History

Cricket administration in India
Football governing bodies in India
Sports governing bodies in India
Military sports governing bodies
Organizations established in 1919
Military sport in India
Recipients of the Rashtriya Khel Protsahan Puruskar
1919 establishments in India
Organisations based in Delhi